David Marc Cohen (born October 6, 1966) is an American football coach. He is the defensive line coach at Wake Forest University. Cohen came to Wake after stint as the defensive coordinator at Rutgers University in 2013. He was formerly the defensive coordinator for the Western Michigan Broncos football team and the final head coach of Hofstra University's football program. He coached the Pride from 2006 through 2009, when Hofstra announced that it was dropping football due to economic and popularity considerations, just days after the season. In his five seasons as head coach, Cohen compiled an 18–27 overall record.

Personal life
Cohen was born in Huntington, New York, and attended Commack High School in Long Island, New York from 1980 to 1984. He attended Long Island University C.W. Post Campus from 1984 to 1988 where he earned a bachelor's degree in business management. Cohen received his master's degree in education administration from the University of Albany in 1990.

Cohen is married to his wife Denise and have two children, Charlie and Brian.

Head coaching record

References

External links
 Wake Forest profile

1966 births
Living people
American football defensive tackles
Albany Great Danes football coaches
LIU Post Pioneers football players
Delaware Fightin' Blue Hens football coaches
Fordham Rams football coaches
Hofstra Pride football coaches
Lafayette Leopards football coaches
Rutgers Scarlet Knights football coaches
Wake Forest Demon Deacons football coaches
Western Michigan Broncos football coaches
University at Albany, SUNY alumni
People from Huntington, New York
Coaches of American football from New York (state)
Players of American football from New York (state)
Jewish American sportspeople
21st-century American Jews